Tongxiang City is a county-level city, part of Jiaxing, in northern Zhejiang Province, China, bordering Jiangsu province to the north. It had a population of 1,029,754 as of the 2020 census even though its built-up (or metro) area is smaller. Nevertheless, as the city is expanding east quickly, its now nearly conurbated with Jiaxing built-up (or metro) area by Xiuzhou District.

Tongxiang was the birthplace of 20th-century novelist and cultural critic Mao Dun. The scenic town of Wuzhen is part of Tongxiang.

Administration
Tongxiang administers three subdistrict, nine towns and one township.
Wutong Subdistrict (梧桐街道), seat of the administration
Fengming Subdistrict (凤鸣街道)
Longxiang Subdistrict (龙翔街道)
Gaoqiao Subdistrict (高桥街道)
Puyuan Town (濮院镇)
Tudian Town (屠甸镇)
Heshan Town (河山镇)
Wuzhen Town (乌镇镇)
Shimen Town (石门镇)
Dama Town (大麻镇)
Chongfu Town (崇福镇)
Zhouquan Town (洲泉镇)
Tongfu Township (同福乡)

Climate

Economy
Hángbáijú (杭白菊), a variety of chrysanthemum flower tea, originates from Tongxiang. There are also annual Chrysanthemum festivals.

Tongxiang is one of biggest woolen sweater manufacturing base. In 2006, Tongxiang sold over 600 million woolen sweaters.

Education
Tongxiang is home to a joint-venture Canadian high school program called Jiaxing Grand Canadian Academy at Maodun Senior High School.  The school offers the British Columbia, Canada high school graduation program that culminates in the awarding of the Dogwood Diploma.  The school enrolls local Chinese students and employs only foreign, B.C. certified teachers to teach all subjects in English (Canadian history, math, science, English, PE, etc.)  The school is on a sprawling campus with modern features (gym, running track, science labs, etc.).  The school opened in 2005 and has been inspected and re-certified by the BC Government (MOE) each year since.

Transport
Tongxiang is served by Tongxiang Railway Station, which connects it to Shanghai, Hangzhou, and other cities with a number of high speed trains.

Twin towns — sister cities
Tongxiang is twinned with:
Bandırma, Turkey since 2002

References

External links

 Tongxiang Government Portal
 2014 World Internet Conference
 Wuzhen Tourism Portal

 
County-level cities in Zhejiang
Jiaxing